The Green Garter Band (GGB) is a group of twelve that plays at numerous events for the University of Oregon. The group has a faculty advisor, the Director of Athletic Bands, but for the most part is run by its student members. The band performs for all UO Women's Volleyball home games, UO Women's Basketball home games, many UO Softball home games and serves as the core unit of the Oregon Marching Band (OMB) and Oregon Basketball Band (OBB).

Green Garter Band members are awarded a scholarship of $6,300. Members of GGB's companion group, the Yellow Garter Band, receive a scholarship of $1350 annually.

Organization

History 

In 2002, the Yellow Garter Band (YGB) was created to help fulfill the number of requests to join the band.

Instrumentation
Instrumentation, one person per part:
Alto Sax 1,
Alto Sax 2,
Tenor Sax,
Bari Sax,
Trumpet 1,
Trumpet 2,
Trumpet 3,
Mellophone,
Lead Trombone,
Bass Trombone,
Keyboards/Guitar~,
Bass Guitar,
Drums.

~ GGB has included a Keyboard or Guitar player into the group occasionally. However, this has never been a permanent position.

Yellow Garter Band (YGB)
In 2002, the Yellow Garter Band (YGB) was created to supplement the Oregon Athletic Bands.

References

External links
 University of Oregon Website
 music.uoregon.edu

University of Oregon
Musical groups from Eugene, Oregon
1983 establishments in Oregon
Musical groups established in 1983